H&K can refer to:

 Heckler & Koch, a German weapons manufacturing company
 Hughes & Kettner, a German brand of guitar and bass amplifiers, cabinets and effects processors
Harold & Kumar, a series of stoner comedies and its titular characters
 Harold & Kumar Go to White Castle, a 2004 film
Harold & Kumar Escape from Guantanamo Bay, its sequel
 Hampstead and Kilburn, a UK parliament constituency
 The Calcium H and K lines, a pair of violet spectral lines
"H-K (Hunter-Killer)", song by Fear Factory from the album Demanufacture, 1995